Huang Zhizhen (October 1920 – February 5, 1993) also known as Zhu Feng, was a People's Republic of China politician. He was born in Hengfeng County, Jiangxi Province. He was the son of New Fourth Army general Huang Dao. He was governor of Hubei Province.

References

1920 births
1993 deaths
People's Republic of China politicians from Jiangxi
Chinese Communist Party politicians from Jiangxi
Governors of Hubei
Alternate members of the 10th Central Committee of the Chinese Communist Party
Members of the 11th Central Committee of the Chinese Communist Party
Members of the 12th Central Committee of the Chinese Communist Party
Politicians from Shangrao